Several ships have been named City of New York, including:

, a transatlantic passenger ship of Inman Line, wrecked at Queenstown (Cobh), Ireland in 1864
, a transatlantic passenger ship, launched as Delaware, completed for Inman Line to replace the 1861 vessel. Sold to Allan Line in 1883 and renamed Norwegian. Scrapped in 1903
, a passenger-cargo vessel of Pacific Mail Steamship Company, wrecked off Point Bonita, California on 26 October 1893
City of New York (1885), Admiral Byrd's polar expedition ship
 (1888), a passenger ship of Inman Line, designed to be the largest and fastest liner on the Atlantic. Later with American Line as New York and broken up in 1923
, a passenger-cargo vessel of American South African Line, sunk by submarine on 29 March 1942.
, a cargo vessel of Ellerman Lines, scrapped as Kavo Matapas in 1969

See also 
List of ships named New York
List of ships named New York City

References

 
 

Ship names
ships named City of New York